Musang King, also known as Mao Shan Wang or D197, is a cultivar (cultivated variety) of durian (Durio zibethinus).  Prized for its unusual combination of bitter and sweet flavors, Musang King is the most popular variety of durian in Malaysia  and commands a price premium over other varieties.  It is also increasingly popular in China, where it has been dubbed the "Hermes of durian".

History
Musang King was originally known as Raja Kunyit, meaning "Turmeric King", a reference to the fruit's turmeric-colored deep yellow flesh.  In the 1980s, a man named Tan Lai Fook from Raub, Pahang stumbled upon a Raja Kunyit durian tree in Gua Musang, Kelantan, Malaysia. He brought a branch of the tree back to Raub for grafting, and this new breed attracted other cultivators. The cultivar was named after Gua Musang, its place of origin.  The Chinese name, literally "Cat Mountain King", may be either a phonetic rendering of musang or a reference to its Malay meaning, the cat-like Asian palm civet.

In 2017, Musang King became the first variety of durian to have its genome sequenced.  The sequencing showed upregulation of pathways related to sulfur, lipid oxidation and ethylene when compared to both other fruits and other durian cultivars like Mon Thong, which correlates with the pungency and stronger perceived taste and smell of the cultivar.

Characteristics
Musang King is known for its buttery, thick, bright yellow flesh and robust flavor, with a hint of bitterness.  The husk is dusky green and has a distinctive star shape at the bottom.  The thorns are pyramidal and not densely packed.

Gallery

References

Durian cultivars
Singaporean cuisine
Malaysian cuisine